General Fry may refer to:

Birkett D. Fry (1822–1891), Confederate States Army brigadier general
James Barnet Fry (1827–1894), Union Army brigadier general and brevet major general
James C. Fry (1897–1982), U.S. Army major general
Robert Fry (born 1951), Royal Marines lieutenant general
Speed S. Fry (1817–1892), Union Army brigadier general
William Fry (British Army officer) (1858–1934), British Army major general

See also
Joseph Frye (1712–1794), Massachusetts Militia general